This article lists those who were potential candidates for the Democratic nomination for Vice President of the United States in the 1988 election. Massachusetts Governor Michael Dukakis won the 1988 Democratic nomination for President of the United States, and chose Texas Senator Lloyd Bentsen as his running mate. Dukakis chose Bentsen in order to appeal to Southerners and in hopes of carrying Bentsen's home state of Texas. The strategy failed, as the Dukakis-Bentsen ticket went on to lose Texas and all other states in the South except West Virginia. The choice of Bentsen caused some backlash from Jesse Jackson, who had wanted to be chosen as the vice presidential nominee, and progressives such as Ralph Nader. Paul Brountas, a longtime Dukakis aide, led the search for Dukakis's running mate. The Dukakis–Bentsen ticket would lose to the Bush–Quayle ticket in the general election. Bentsen simultaneously ran for reelection as Senator, and easily won, despite the Dukakis-Bentsen ticket's double-digit loss in Texas.

Possible running mates

Final Seven

Media speculation on possible vice presidential candidates

See also
Michael Dukakis 1988 presidential campaign
1988 Democratic Party presidential primaries
1988 Democratic National Convention
1988 United States presidential election
List of United States major party presidential tickets
Senator, you're no Jack Kennedy

References

Vice presidency of the United States
1988 United States presidential election